An election for Mayor of Tampa was held on March 5, 2019. The election is officially nonpartisan, and the winner is elected to a four-year term.

Incumbent mayor Bob Buckhorn is not eligible to run for a third term. Buckhorn was first elected in 2011 (winning in the second round with 62.86% of the vote) and reelected unopposed in 2015. Jane Castor and David Straz headed off into a runoff election on April 23, 2019, as no candidate received the majority fifty percent. Castor defeated Straz in the runoff election, becoming mayor-elect of Tampa.

Candidates

Declared
Harry Cohen, two term city councilman
Jane Castor, former police chief
Dick Greco Jr., retired judge and son of former mayor Dick A. Greco
Michael Anthony Hazard, small business owner
LaVaughn King, activist
Topher Morrison, small business owner
David Straz Jr., philanthropist
Mike Suarez, member of Tampa City Council
Ed Turanchik, former Hillsborough County commissioner

Did not file
Ed Narain, former state representative
Mike Griffin, former chairman of Tampa Chamber of Commerce

Withdrawn
Sam Gibbons, graduate student and grandson of late U.S. representative Sam Gibbons

Endorsements

Fundraising

Polling
{| class="wikitable"
|- valign=bottom
! Poll source
! Date(s)administered
! Samplesize
! Marginof error
! style="width:75px;"| JaneCastor
! style="width:75px;"| HarryCohen
! style="width:75px;"| DavidStraz Jr.
! style="width:75px;"| MikeSuarez
! style="width:75px;"| EdTuranchik
! style="width:75px;"| Dick Greco, Jr.
! style="width:75px;"| Other
! style="width:75px;"| Undecided
|-
|St. Pete Polls
| align=center| May 10, 2018
| align=center| 424
| align=center| ±4.8%
|  align=center| 47.3%
| align=center| 5.4%
| align=center| 7.8%
| align=center| 5.5%
|  align=center| 9.7%
| align=center| -
| align=center| 8.3%
| align=center| 15.9%
|-
|St. Pete Polls
| align=center| June 24, 2018
| align=center| 496
| align=center| ±4.4%
|  align=center| 40.9%
| align=center| 7.3%
|  align=center| 10.6%
| align=center| 7.2%
| align=center| 7.2%
| align=center| -
| align=center| 7.8%
| align=center| 18.9%
|-
|St. Pete Polls
| align=center| February 5, 2019
| align=center| 429
| align=center| ±4.7%
|  align=center| 45.3%
| align=center| 7.5%
|  align=center| 12.9%
| align=center| 6.0%
| align=center| 6.7%
| align=center| 9.3%
| align=center| -
| align=center| 10.8%
|-

Results

First round

Runoff

References

Tampa
Tampa
21st century in Tampa, Florida
March 2019 events in the United States
2019